The flag of the Italian region of Friuli-Venezia Giulia depicts a golden eagle facing to its right standing on white fortifications on a blue background.

Symbolism 
The colours (gold and blue) originate from the historic flag of Friuli used by the medieval Patria del Friuli – a state that was independent from 1077 to 1420 and ruled by the Patriarchate of Aquileia. The symbols of the eagle comes from the name of the ancient city of Aquileia, which, according to popular legend, derived from an eagle who showed the first citizens the spot where the ancient city should be founded.

The modern flag, adopted in 2001, uses an eagle design found on an antique vase kept in a museum in Aquileia.

History

References

Flags of regions of Italy
Flag
Fruili-Venezia
Friuli-Venezia Giulia